São Lucas is a monorail station of the São Paulo Metro. Belongs to Line 15–Silver, which is currently in expansion, and should reach the district of Cidade Tiradentes, with connection with Line 2–Green in Vila Prudente. It is placed in Av. Prof. Luis Inácio de Anhaia Mello, 5400.

Its construction started in 2015. It was opened on April 6, 2018 by the Government of the State of São Paulo.

Station layout

References

São Paulo Metro stations
Railway stations opened in 2018